This is a list of the England women's national football team results from 1990 to 1999.

Results

1990

1991

1992

1993

1994

1995

1996

1997

1998

1999

References

1990s in England
1990s